This Is It! (The A&M Years 1979–1989), released in February 1997, is a Joe Jackson compilation double album covering his period with A&M Records between the years 1979 and 1989.

Allmusic journalist Stephen Thomas Erlewine laments that the album does not include any material from Laughter & Lust -- released in 1991 on the Virgin Records music label -- but otherwise presents a comprehensive overview of Jackson's work. In his book The Great Rock Discography journalist Martin C. Strong awards the album 8 out of 10.

Track listing
All songs written and arranged by Joe Jackson, except where noted.

References

External links 
 This Is It album information at The Joe Jackson Archive

1997 compilation albums
Joe Jackson (musician) albums
A&M Records compilation albums
Albums produced by David Kershenbaum